The first season of Body of Proof, an American television series created by Christopher Murphey, commenced airing in the United States on March 29, 2011, concluded May 17, 2011, and consisted of 9 episodes. It follows the life and career of Dr. Megan Hunt, a medical examiner, once a neurosurgeon, who now works in Philadelphia's Medical Examiner's office after a car accident ended her neurosurgery career. Along with Hunt solving homicide cases are her colleagues, Nicholas Bishop as Peter Dunlop, Jeri Ryan as Dr. Kate Murphy, John Carroll Lynch and Sonja Sohn as Detective's Bud Morris and Samantha Baker and fellow medical examiners, Geoffrey Arend as Dr. Ethan Gross and Windell Middlebrooks as Dr. Curtis Brumfield. Mary Mouser plays Megan's daughter Lacey, Jeffrey Nordling plays her ex-husband Todd and Joanna Cassidy plays her mother Joan. All of whom she has a strained relationship with, one of the continuing stories throughout the season.

Body of Proof''' first season aired in the United States (U.S.) on Tuesdays at 10:00 pm ET on ABC, a terrestrial television network. In the United Kingdom, the season premiered on July 19, 2011 at 9pm, and subsequently aired Tuesdays at 10 pm on Channel 5. It aired in Canada on Citytv and in Australia on Channel Seven. Body of Proof — The Complete First Season'' was released on DVD as a two-disc set on September 20, 2011 by Buena Vista Home Entertainment in Region 1, on November 5, 2012 in Region 2 and August 15, 2012 in Region 4.

Note that episode list includes the names of the murderers (unlike normal Wikipedia episode lists).

Cast and characters

Episodes

Ratings

DVD release

References

External links

2011 American television seasons
1